The General People's Committee (al-lajna ash-sha'biyya al-'āmma), often abbreviated as the GPCO, was the executive branch of the government of Libya, during the existence of Muammar Gaddafi's Libyan Arab Jamahiriya. It served as the intermediary between the masses and government leadership and was composed of the Secretary-General and twenty secretaries of some 600 local Basic People's Congresses (BPC), GPCO members were elected by the country's parliament, the General People's Congress (GPC), and had no fixed terms.

It was the rough equivalent of the cabinet in many republics, constitutional democracies, and constitutional monarchies, as well as the Executive Board of the rival National Transitional Council, which ultimately replaced the jamahiriya as Libya's dominant force in 2011, as a result of the First Libyan Civil War. The GPCO was scattered by the fall of Tripoli, with some of its members fleeing into exile, some becoming prisoners of war, and some remaining in Libya.

History
In March 1977, the General People's Congress (GPC) adopted the "Declaration on the Establishment of the Authority of the People" and proclaimed the Libyan Arab Jamahiriya. The people exercise authority through the people's committees, people's congresses, professional associations, and the GPC. Elections were direct, and all voting consisted of a show of hands or a division into yea-or-nay camps. Suffrage and committee or congress membership were open to all Libyan citizens eighteen years of age or older in good legal and political standing.

In theory, the residents of each zone elected their own people's committee. Similarly, the residents of each branch municipality elected their own Basic People's Congress (BPC). The BPC members then elected a chairman and a five-member branch or municipal people's committee. The General People's Congress was made up of the chairmen of the BPC, the branch and municipal people's committees, and representatives of the people's committees for unions, professional associations and student unions. The GPCO replaced the former Council of Ministers, its members being referred to as secretaries rather than ministers. Legislative and executive authority was vested in the GPC. This body, however, delegated most important authority to its general secretary and General Secretariat and to the GPCO. Muammar Gaddafi, as general secretary of the GPC, remained primary policy maker. As a part of a decentralisation program undertaken during September 1988, all GPCO secretariats, except those responsible for foreign policy and information, were relocated away from Tripoli. In early 1993 it was announced that the Secretariat for Foreign Liaison and International Cooperation was to be moved to Ra's Lanuf.

Competences of GPCO
 Implement laws and resolutions issued by the GPC ( مؤتمر الشعب العام ) formulated by the BPC ( المؤتمرات شعبية اساسية ).
 Prepare project proposals and budgets for the General Planning Council.
 Present plans for public projects to the General Planning Council.
 Propose bills, as well as other topics presented to the BPCs.
 Implement and manage strategic projects.
 Monitor BPC committees, institutions and public companies ensuring accordance to BPC decisions.
 Supervise the Great Manmade River project and other investments.
 Issue decisions on organizational structures for the government.
 Encourage foreign investment in Libya and monitor investments abroad.
 Adopt curriculum.
 Issue regulations governing contract work financed from the budget.
 Issue and regulate laws as stipulated by the jurisdiction.
 Establish, consolidate and organize institutions, companies and public works.
 Operational cost of the GPC or BPC.

Responsibilities
 Implement laws and resolutions issued by the BPCs drafted in the GPC.
 Invitation to GPCO meetings and monitor implementation.
 Propose bills and other topics presented to the GPCO for approval.
 Conclude treaties, conventions and the international loans (ratified by the BPC).
 Adopt minutes for joint committee meetings, and address questions of international cooperation.
 Name Trustees and BPC members and agencies; public corporations and general assembly members of public companies as determined by executive regulations.
 Authorize international institutions and public companies contracting with foreign companies.
 Investigate the popular committees, and punish them in accordance with existing legislation.
 Work assigned by the GPC, secretariat of the GPCO, or the GPCO for the traditional.

GPCO ministers

In January 2007, the General People's Committee consisted of the following members:

The Ministry of Foreign Affairs includes the following Assistants:
 Muhammad Tahir Sayyala, Assistant Foreign Minister for Cooperation
 Ali Treki, Assistant Foreign Minister for African Affairs
 Muftah Omar Madi, Assistant Foreign Minister for Magharibi Affairs

Other Secretary assistants
 Omaran Hemida Sudani, Assistant Secretary of Public Security (now acting Secretary for Public Security)
 Ashour Khalifa Tribil, Assistant Secretary of Finance

See also 

 Basic People's Congress (administrative division)
 Basic People's Congress (political)
 Direct democracy
 General People's Congress (Libya)
 Human rights in Libya under Gaddafi

References 

Government of Libya
Political history of Libya
Libya
History of Libya under Muammar Gaddafi
1977 establishments in Libya
2011 disestablishments in Libya